The Union Presbyterian Church in Korea was organised in 1990 when Mok Presbytery was organised. Later it changed its name to YunHap Assembly. In 1992 it was constituted as a church. It has almost 11,000 members and 20 congregations in 2004. The Westminster Confession is generally accepted.

References 

Presbyterian denominations in South Korea